Genuine & Counterfeit is the first solo studio album by American singer William Beckett. The album is the first full-length released by William since the break-up of his band The Academy Is.... It was released by the New York-based independent record label, Equal Vision Records, and produced by Marc McClusky.

Track listing

Charts

References

2013 debut albums
Equal Vision Records albums
William Beckett (singer) albums